Elections to Runnymede Council were held on 1 May 2003. One third of the council was up for election and the Conservative Party stayed in overall control of the council.

After the election, the composition of the council was:
Conservative 32
Runnymede Residents Association 6
Labour 4

Election result

Ward results

References
2003 Runnymede election result
Ward results

2003
2003 English local elections
2000s in Surrey